The 1979 Jack Kramer Open, also known as the Pacific Southwest Open, was a men's tennis tournament played on indoor carpet courts at the Pauley Pavilion in Los Angeles, California in the United States. The event was part of the Grand Prix tennis circuit. It was the 53rd edition of the Pacific Southwest tournament and was held from September 17 through September 23, 1979.

Tournament director Jack Kramer underwrote the tournament after ARCO ended their sponsorship of the event. Eight-seeded Peter Fleming won the singles title after defeating his doubles partner and first-seed John McEnroe in the final and earned $28,000 first-prize money.

Finals

Singles
 Peter Fleming defeated  John McEnroe 6–4, 6–4
 It was Fleming's 2nd singles title of the year and the 3rd of his career.

Doubles
 Marty Riessen /  Sherwood Stewart defeated  Wojciech Fibak /  Frew McMillan 6–4, 6–4

References

External links
 ITF tournament edition details

Los Angeles Open (tennis)
Jack Kramer Open
Jack Kramer Open
Jack Kramer Open
Jack Kramer Open